Skrzynki  is a village in the administrative district of Gmina Jeżewo, within Świecie County, Kuyavian-Pomeranian Voivodeship, in north-central Poland. The village has a population of 60.

References

Villages in Świecie County